Riley is a crater on Venus.

The crater's diameter is 40 times the depth resulting in a relatively shallow appearance.

References

Impact craters on Venus